Ramsagar National Park is a national park in Bangladesh located at.   25°33'00"N 88°37'30"E   Tejpur, near   Dinajpur District in the north-west of the country. The Park is 27.76 hectare, in size, and is built around a large water reservoir known as "Ramsagar tank". The lake is 1079m in length and 192.6m in width. The soil is red-yellow clay

History
The tank was built in the 18th century by Raja Ram Nath. It is believed that the lake was excavated by King Ramnath, Maharaja of Dinajpur before the Battle of Plassey. The tank was dug by 15 million workers at a cost of 30,000 Taka.

Management
The park is managed by 8 staff members which include 1 forest officers, 3 gardeners, 3 forest guards and 1 watchman.  It was first established in year 1960 and was earlier recommended that the park be developed as class-B national park for recreation and education by the Government of east Pakistan in 1971. It was declared as national park on 30-4-2001 under the Bangladesh wildlife (Preservation) Amendment Act of 1947.

Flora and Fauna
There are no big trees; the park consists of a big lake surrounded by embankments. Most of the flora and fauna are associated with wetland ecosystem.

Flora
272 plant species belonging to 132 families were recorded in this sanctuary. Mangifera indica, Syzygium cumini, Tamarindus indica, and Semecarpus anacardium are some of the trees found in the sanctuary.

Fauna
The lake is full of different types of fishes. There are turtles and fresh water crocodiles in the lake. The animals found here are spotted deer, wild boar, blue bull, sloth bear and  Asian black bear. The water birds mainly white breasted water hen, jacanas, river tern, kingfishers, ringed plover, grey heron and purple heron are found here.

Threats
The plants inside the park are removed by the local villagers for food, fodder, making furniture, medicine and fuel. There is a decrease in the indigenous fish species due to overexploitation. The other factors affecting the biodiversity of the park are agricultural pollution, siltation, diseases and floods.

See also

 List of protected areas of Bangladesh

References

National parks of Bangladesh
Dinajpur District, Bangladesh
Protected areas established in 1974
1974 establishments in Bangladesh
Organisations based in Dinajpur
Forests of Bangladesh
Lower Gangetic Plains moist deciduous forests